Kataoka Ichizō is a kabuki stage name which originated in the Osaka theatre, but whose actors are now based in Tokyo. The name has been passed down from the early 19th-century to the present day through six generations. The  family crest used to represent the line is the  inverted ginkgo leaf design.

Kataoka Ichizō I

Biography 

 was born  in 1792, the son of a low-ranking kabuki actor who gave him his initial training. In 1810 he began an apprenticeship under respected actor , and took the name Kataoka Ichizō I.
He began his career by performing in minor Osaka area  theatres and on stages erected within shrine grounds. In 1820, he became attached to Osaka's  theatre. He also travelled throughout Japan, performing in Edo, Kyoto, Nagoya and Ise. He took actors Kataoka Ichizō II and Kataoka Ichōmaru under his wing as disciples.
He was so admired for these performances that he earned the nickname : King of the Villains. He was, however, also credited with the ability to deliver subtle  dramatic performances, particularly in  elderly man roles.
Ichizō I held the name from 1810 to 1858 when he took the name . From 1860 to the spring of 1862, Ichizō took a break from performing due to eye problems and encroaching senility. In the 5th lunar month of 1862 he appeared on stage for the last time in the play "Ōmi Genji Senjin Yakata." He died in the 7th lunar month of 1862.

Names 

Ichizō I was associated with a number of names throughout his life, as per kabuki convention:
 Stage names:  (1858),  (1810-1862), Fujikawa Kanezō, Fujikawa Kanesaburō
 Nickname:  
 : ,  

Artworks 

Kataoka Ichizō I appears in prints by the following artists:
 Sadamasu
 Toshikuni
 Utagawa Kunikazu
 Kunisada
 Konishi Hirosada

Kataoka Ichizō II

Biography 

Very little is known of Ichizō II's personal details, including the dates of his birth and death. He began his career with the Kataoka family as a disciple of Ichizō I, but went on to study with the Nakamura clan under Nakamura Utaemon IV. His speciality was supporting katakiyaku villain roles. After spending some time in the late 1850s performing in Edo to great acclaim, he returned to Osaka where he rejoined the Kataoka family. He took the name  early in 1865, almost three years after the death of his predecessor. His name ceased appearing on kabuki playbills in the last years of the Edo period.

Names 

Ichizō II was associated with the following names throughout his career:
 Stage names: Kataoka Takizō, Nakamura Hangorō, Nakamura Kajaku (1857-1860), Kataoka Jūzō (1860-1865), Kataoka Ichizō (1865-)
 Haimyō: Kajaku, Roen
 Yagō: Yamagataya

Kataoka Ichizō III

Biography 

His first professional appearance was on an Osaka stage in 1855. He was known for his wide-ranging skills, and particularly his portrayal of katakiyaku villains and fukeyaku elderly men. Following the sudden death of his brother, Inemaru, Ichizō III was forced to give up kabuki and begin an apprenticeship in the trades. He returned to the stage, however, becoming a disciple of Kataoka Nizaemon VIII in 1886. In 1887, he became Ichizō III, a title he held until his death in December, 1906.

Names 

 Personal name: 
 Stage names:  (1855),  (c. 1869),  (1886), Kataoka Ichizō III (1887)
 Haimyō: 
 Yagō: ,

Kataoka Ichizō IV

Biography 

 was born in the Shitaya district of Tokyo in 1880. Later he was adopted by Ichizō III, who trained him until his debut at Tokyo's Nakamura-za theatre in 1887. He continued to perform until 1904 when the outbreak of the Russo-Japanese War resulted in his being sent to the front. In 1906, he was discharged from the military. The general euphoria over Japan's military victory carried over to the theatre, where houses were frequently packed. In 1909, almost 3 full years after the death of his adoptive father, he succeeded to the Ichizō line. He went on to hold this title until his death in 1926, meaning that his career spanned the Meiji and Taishō periods.
Ichizō IV was noted for his loud voice and large personality, which made him well-suited to strong leading roles. He was praised in particular for his  female roles, as well as his  and  dance performances.

Names 

 Personal name:  
 Stage names:  (1887-1904),  (1904-1909), Kataoka Ichizō IV (1909-1926)
 Haimyō: Gashō
 Yagō: Matsushimaya

Artwork 

 Natori Shunsen

Kataoka Ichizō V

Biography 

Born in Tokyo on February 10, 1916,  was the eldest son of Ichizō IV. He first appeared on the kabuki stage in January 1922 at Tokyo's  theatre in the role of a child. He became head of the Kataoka Ichizō line in October 1934. On June 30, 1991, aged 75, Ichizō fell from the platform at Tokyo's Yushima subway station and died.

Ichizō V was known for his performance of supporting roles. His two sons followed in his steps as kabuki actors, the eldest becoming , and the youngest becoming . His daughter married  performer .

Names 

 Personal name: 
 Stage names:  Kataoka Ichizō V (1934-1991)
 Haimyō: 
 Yagō: Matsushimaya

Signature roles 

  in 
  in 
  in

Kataoka Ichizō VI

Biography 

, born in Tokyo on December 12, 1958, is the oldest son of Ichizō V. He has held the rank of principal actor since 1985, and held the Ichizō VI title since May, 2003. He has performed internationally, including appearing at the Paris Opera. He currently has as his disciple his younger brother, .

Names 

 Personal Name: 
 Stage names: Kataoka Kōichi (1962-1969),  (1969-2003),  (2003- )
 Haimyō: Gashō
 Yagō: Matsushimaya

Signature roles 

  in 
  in

Awards 

 1972: National Theatre Award Encouragement Prize [国立劇場奨励賞]
 1983: National Theatre Award Encouragement Prize [国立劇場奨励賞]
 1989: Kansai Kabuki Preservation Association Award Encouragement Prize [関西で歌舞伎を育てる会奨励賞]
 1990: Mayama Seika Award for Best Supporting Actor [眞山青果賞助演賞]
 1993: National Theatre Award Encouragement Prize [国立劇場奨励賞]
 1995: 1st Annual Japan Actors' Association Encouragement Prize [第一回日本俳優協会賞奨励賞]
 1997: Kabuki-za Prize [歌舞伎座賞]
 2009: National Theatre Award of Excellence [国立劇場優秀賞]
 2010: National Theatre Encouragement Prize [国立劇場奨励賞]

Notes

See also 

 Bust portrait of Actor Kataoka Ichizō I (Gochōtei Sadamasu II)
 Utagawa Kunimasu

References 

 Aragorō, Shōriya. "Kataoka Ichizō I." Kabuki 21.com. Accessed December 1, 2013. http://www.kabuki21.com/ichizo.php
 Kataoka Ichizō. "六代目片岡市蔵 [Kataoka Ichizō VI]." Accessed December 6, 2013. http://www.kataichi.com/
 Katō, Kyōko. "片岡市蔵 [Kataoka Ichizō I]." Kotobank.jp. Accessed December 1, 2013. https://web.archive.org/web/20130510065821/http://kotobank.jp/word/%E7%89%87%E5%B2%A1%E5%B8%82%E8%94%B5
 Keyes, Roger S. and Keiko Mizushima. The Theatrical World of Osaka Prints. Boston: Philadelphia Museum of Art, 1973.
 野島寿三郎 [Nojima, Jusaburō].　歌舞伎人名事典 [Kabuki jinmei jiten]. Tokyo: Kinokuniya Shoten, 1988.
 Weblio. "片岡市蔵 (3代目) [Kataoka Ichizō III]." 2013. Accessed December 5, 2013.  http://www.weblio.jp/content/片岡市蔵3代目

External sources 
 http://www.kataichi.com/ - Official website of Kataoka Ichizō (in Japanese)
 http://www.kabuki-bito.jp/eng/top.html - Official website of Shochiku Kabuki

Kabuki actors
Japanese male actors
Japanese culture